Zoë Hoskins (born 17 January 1981) is a Canadian rower. She competed in the women's coxless pair event at the 2008 Summer Olympics.

References

External links
 

1981 births
Living people
Canadian female rowers
Olympic rowers of Canada
Rowers at the 2008 Summer Olympics
Sportspeople from Edmonton
Pan American Games medalists in rowing
Pan American Games gold medalists for Canada
Pan American Games silver medalists for Canada
Rowers at the 2007 Pan American Games
21st-century Canadian women